The Sanook bent-toed gecko (Cyrtodactylus sanook) is a species of gecko that is endemic to southern Thailand.

References

Cyrtodactylus
Reptiles described in 2013